The Commission of Experts on Reforms of the International Monetary and Financial System, chaired by Joseph Stiglitz and not to be confused with the concurrent Commission on the Measurement of Economic Performance and Social Progress he also chaired, was convened by the President of the United Nations General Assembly, Miguel d'Escoto Brockmann, "to review the workings of the global financial system, including major bodies such as the World Bank and the IMF, and to suggest steps to be taken by Member States to secure a more sustainable and just global economic order". 

It presented its recommendations on 20 March 2009 and a preliminary draft of its full report on 21 May 2009. The final report was released 21 September 2009.

Notes

External links
Official site
Final report
Summary report
Stiglitz-Sen-Fitoussi Commission
Final report, September 14, 2009
Reflections and Overview, Stiglitz, Sen and Fitoussi, September 16, 2009

International finance